Maleagi Ngarizemo (born 21 June 1979) is a retired Namibian footballer.

Career
Nagrizemo has played for Mydatjies, United Africa Tigers, Phungo All Stars and African Stars F.C. in Namibia and South Africa for F.C. Cape Town and Black Leopards.

In 2010, he joined North York Astros in the Canadian Soccer League.

International career
Ngarizemo is a member of the Namibia national football team since 2001 and played with the team at the 2008 Africa Cup of Nations.

References

1979 births
Living people
Footballers from Windhoek
Canadian Soccer League (1998–present) players
Namibia international footballers
2008 Africa Cup of Nations players
African Stars F.C. players
F.C. Civics Windhoek players
Expatriate soccer players in Canada
North York Astros players
Association football defenders
Expatriate soccer players in South Africa
Namibian expatriate footballers
F.C. Cape Town players
Namibian expatriate sportspeople in Canada
Namibian expatriate sportspeople in South Africa
Black Leopards F.C. players
Namibian men's footballers